Nebraskan may refer to:

 A person from the U.S. state of Nebraska

 Daily Nebraskan, the student newspaper of the University of Nebraska–Lincoln
 The Nebraskan, a 1953 American Western film
 Nebraskan stage, a discarded geological period now incorporated in the Pre-Illinoian stage